The Way We Went Wild is a three-part BBC TV series, first shown on BBC Two, about British wildlife presenters. It was narrated by Josette Simon.

Episode 1
Episode 1, screened on 13 June 2004, featured Johnny Morris and Bill Oddie.

Episode 2
Episode 2, screened on 20 June 2004, featured Sir Peter Scott and Sir David Attenborough.

Episode 3
Episode 3, screened on 27 June 2004, again featured Attenborough, plus a number of more recent, younger wildlife presenters, including Saba Douglas-Hamilton, Steve Leonard and Charlotte Uhlenbroek.

Interviewees
The people interviewed about the featured presenters were:

Doug Allen
Richard Attenborough (brother of David)
Chris Baines
Linda Barker
Laura Beaumont (wife of Bill Oddie)
David Bellamy
Mike Beynon
Jeffery Boswall
Richard Brock
Tim Brooke-Taylor
Nicola Davies
Dudu Douglas-Hamilton
Iain Douglas-Hamilton
John Downer
Alastair Fothergill
Graeme Garden
Jane Goodall (uncredited archive footage)
David Gower
Hans Hass (archive footage)
Lotte Hass (archive footage)
Diane-Louise Jordan
Eric Knowles
Betty Leonard
Dennis Leonard
Shauna Lowry
Nigel Marven
Leonard Miall
Desmond Morris
Stephen Moss
Trude Mostue
Neil Nightingale
Terry Nutkins
Chris Packham
Don Packham
Barry Paine
Michael Peacock
Julian Pettifer
Alan Root
Gaby Roslin
Mike Salisbury
Falcon Scott
Jonathan Scott
Philippa Scott
Robert Falcon Scott (uncredited archive footage)
Keith Shackleton
Tony Soper
John Sparks
Michaela Strachan
Moira Stuart
Roger Tabor, cat biologist, The Wild Life of the Domestic Cat
Alan Titchmarsh
Colin Willock
Sheila Young

External links
 

2004 British television series debuts
2004 British television series endings
2000s British documentary television series
BBC television documentaries
Documentary films about nature
2000s British television miniseries
English-language television shows